The Magdalo was a faction of the Katipunan (a Philippine revolutionary organization with the aim to gain independence from Spain during the Philippine Revolution) chapter in Cavite.

It was named after Mary Magdalene, patroness of Kawit, Cavite. It was officially led by Baldomero Aguinaldo, but his cousin Emilio Aguinaldo (whose own Katipunan codename was "Magdalo") was its most famous leader.

The Magdalo had a rivalry with the other Katipunan chapter in Cavite, the Magdiwang (both factions are terminologies for feasts: "dalo" in Tagalog means to attend, diwang means to celebrate). When the Manila-based Katipunan leader Andres Bonifacio went to Cavite to mediate between them, the Magdalo argued for the replacement of the Katipunan by a revolutionary government. The Magdiwang initially backed Bonifacio's stance that the Katipunan already served as their government, but at the Tejeros Convention, both factions were combined into one government body under Emilio Aguinaldo who was elected as the president.

Some of the civil and military officials of the First Philippine Republic came from this group.

Magdalo Leaders 
 Baldomero Aguinaldo - President
 Edilberto Evangelista - Vice President
 Candido Tirona - Secretary of War
 Felix Cuenca - Secretary of Interior
 Glicerio Topacio - Secretary of Public Works
 Cayetano Topacio - Secretary of Finance
 Emilio Aguinaldo - Flag Officer

Magdalo Municipalities
 Cavite El Viejo
 Imus
 Silang
 Bakood
 Carmona
 Mendez-Nuñez
 Dasmariñas
 Amadeo

References

Further reading
 

Rebel groups in the Philippines
Katipunan
History of Cavite